City Reading (Tre Storie Western) is a 2003 album by the French duo Air in collaboration with the Italian writer Alessandro Baricco. In this album, Baricco narrates some passages from his novel City with Air's music in the background. The impetus for the album was in 2001, when Air performed background music to a live theater reading of City at the request of Baricco. The following month, they recorded three excerpts from his book: Bird (track 1), La Puttana Di Closingtown (tracks 2–10) and Caccia All'Uomo (tracks 11–19). The album was mixed by Radiohead producer Nigel Godrich.

Track listing

References

External links
 

2003 albums
Air (French band) albums
Albums produced by Nigel Godrich
Astralwerks albums